The Bishop of Ossory is an episcopal title which takes its name after the ancient of Kingdom of Ossory in the Province of Leinster, Ireland. In the Roman Catholic Church it remains a separate title, but in the Church of Ireland it has been united with other bishoprics.

History 
The diocese of Ossory was one of the twenty-four dioceses established at the Synod of Rathbreasail in 1111 and coincided with the ancient Kingdom of Ossory (Osraige); this is unusual, as Christian dioceses are almost always named for cities, not for regions. The episcopal see has always been in Kilkenny, the capital of Ossory at the time of the Synod of Rathbreasail. The erroneous belief that the cathedral was originally further north at Aghaboe is traced by John Bradley to a 16th-century misinterpretation of a 13th-century property transfer, combined with the fact that the abbey at the site which became St Canice's Cathedral, Kilkenny, was a daughter house of Aghaboe Abbey.

Following the Reformation, there were parallel apostolic successions. In the Church of Ireland, the see of Ossory combined with Ferns and Leighlin to form the united bishopric of Ossory, Ferns and Leighlin in 1835.

In the Roman Catholic Church, the title continues as a separate bishopric. The bishop's seat (cathedra) is located at St. Mary's Cathedral, Kilkenny. The current Ordinary is the Most Reverend Niall Coll, who was appointed by the Holy See on 28 October 2022 and ordained bishop on 29 December 2022.

Pre-diocesan succession

The following list of bishops is inscribed in St Mary's Cathedral, Kilkenny and was listed on the Roman Catholic diocese's website. Bishops in the early Irish church ruled over a kingdom, in this case, Osraige or Ossory, but were also often associated with a particular monastery and may have been in some matters subordinate to its abbot.

 St. Ciarán of Saigir (Kieran) (Feast date: 5 March) According to his vitae, St. Ciarán was ordained to the episcopate by Pope Celestine I.
 St. Carthage (Feast date: 5 March)
 St. Medran (Feast date: 8 June)
 St. Sedna (Feast date: 10 March)
 St. Muccine (Feast date: 4 March)
 St. Modomnoc (Feast date: 13 February)
 St. Aengus Lamoidan (Feast date: 16 February)
 St. Lachtin (Feast date: 19 March)
 St. Colman Ua Eirc (Feast date: 22 April)
 St. Cuillen (Feast date: 22 April)
 St. Bochonna (Feast date: 13 January)
 St. Finnech Duirn (Feast date: 2 February)
 St. Eochan (Feast date: 18 April)
 St. Killene Mac Lubne (d. 696)
 Laidhgnen Mac Doinlanach (d. 739)
 Tnuthgall (d. 771)
 Mocoach (d. 788)
 Cucathrach (d. 793)
 Cothach (d. 812)
 Fereoach (d. 814)
 Conchobhar (d. 815)
 Conmhach Ua Loichene (d. 826)
 Inchalach (d. 832)
 Anluan (d. 846)
 Cormac Mac Eladhach (d. 867)
 Ceran Departed (d. 868)
 Sloidhedhach (d. 885)
 Cormac (d. 907)
 Fearchal (d. 919)
 Fochartach (d. 941)
 Colman (d. 948)
 Confoelad (d. 951)
 Donchadh (d. 971)
 Fochartach (d. 1004)
 Donchad Ua Celieachair (d. 1048)
 Comhoran (d. 1066)
 Ceallack Reamhar (d. 1079)
 Ceallack Ua Caonhoran (d. 1108)

Pre-Reformation bishops

Bishops during the Reformation

Post-Reformation Roman Catholic succession

Church of Ireland succession

References

External links 
 GCatholic with Catholic incumbent bio links

Ossory
Ossory
Roman Catholic bishops of Ossory
Religion in County Kilkenny
Bishops of Kildare or Ferns or Leighlin or of Ossory
Bishops of Ossory
Anglican bishops of Ossory